Jana Korešová (born 8 April 1981) is a Czech former track and field athlete who competed in the heptathlon and long jump at international elite competitions. She is a Summer Universiade silver medalist in the heptathlon and a 12-time Czech champion in the long jump and pentathlon.

References

1981 births
Living people
Athletes from Prague
Czech heptathletes
Czech female long jumpers
Competitors at the 2009 Summer Universiade
Medalists at the 2009 Summer Universiade
World Athletics Championships athletes for the Czech Republic
Universiade silver medalists in athletics (track and field)
Universiade silver medalists for the Czech Republic
21st-century Czech women